Senior is the fourth studio album by Norwegian electronic music duo Röyksopp. It was released on 8 September 2010 by Wall of Sound. Consisting of instrumental tracks only, the album is described as more introspective and withdrawn than its predecessor, Junior (2009). The final track on the CD version, "A Long, Long Way", also includes the hidden track "The Final Day", which is available as a separate track on the iTunes Store.

The album debuted at number 33 on the UK Albums Chart with first-week sales of 3,864 copies. Senior spawned two singles: "The Drug" and "Forsaken Cowboy". In December 2012, the album was awarded a silver certification from the Independent Music Companies Association (IMPALA), indicating sales in excess of 20,000 copies throughout Europe.

Background
Senior is intended to be an introspective, withdrawn, atmospheric counterpart to the "bubbly dance grooves" of Junior (2009), with Röyksopp stating it has a more "autumn mood" to it, in contrast to Juniors "spring feel". In an interview with KCRW's Morning Becomes Eclectic, Svein Berge dubbed Senior "the senile sibling of Junior who lives in the attic". Berge cited "The Alcoholic" as a standout track, explaining that they had "this romantic, nostalgic idea based on this hobo who hitchhikes on trains and travels from place to place".

Promotion
To promote Senior, Röyksopp released a 10-minute film titled Röyksopp's Adventures in Barbieland on 6 August 2010, containing six tracks from the album. Directed by Andreas Nilsson, the film shows Röyksopp living as two elderly musicians in a house full of Barbie dolls.

"The Drug" was released as the album's lead single on 8 August 2010. The music video for the song, directed by Norwegian film duo That Go (Noel Paul and Stefan Moore), premiered on 3 September 2010. The video features three girls (Amanda Bauer, Jessie Vanatta and Jenna Lammert) in airbrushed T-shirts walking through an apocalyptic landscape in Detroit, Michigan. An extended, 10-minute cut of the video, redubbed "Senior Living", that uses six tracks from the album was released on 18 November 2010. The album's second single, "Forsaken Cowboy", was released on 25 February 2011.

On 4 November 2010, Röyksopp partnered with Genero.tv to launch a competition allowing fans to create videos for each one of the tracks from Senior. The winners were announced on 27 January 2011, with a video for "The Alcoholic" being chosen as the overall winner.

Track listing

Personnel
Credits adapted from the liner notes of Senior.

 Röyksopp – performance, recording, production, instruments ; bass 
 Ole Vegard Skauge – bass 
 Kato Ådland – guitar ; bass 
 Davide Rossi – string arrangements, strings 
 Lindy Fay Hella – vocals 
 Bjørn Sæther – drums 
 Mike Marsh – mastering

Charts

Release history

References

2010 albums
Instrumental albums
Röyksopp albums
Virgin Records albums
Wall of Sound (record label) albums